Peter Joseph Kenna (18 March 193029 November 1987) was an Australian playwright, radio actor and screenwriter. He has been called "a quasi-legendary figure in Australian theatre, never quite fashionable, but never quite forgotten either."

Biography

Early life
Born in Balmain, New South Wales, Kenna left school at fourteen and took up various jobs.  He started working in the theatre by participating in concert parties at the camps in Sydney during World War II.

Career
His first play was written when he was 21.

In 1959. the play The Slaughter of St Teresa's Day was produced in Sydney, based on the life of Tilly Devine. The play was turned into a television drama in 1960.

He went to London in the early 1960s.

He wrote the screenplay for the film The Good Wife (also known as The Umbrella Woman) produced in 1987, a World War II drama about a man, his wife and his brother. The film starred Bryan Brown, Rachel Ward and Sam Neill. Rachel Ward won the Tokyo International Film Festival award for best actress for the film, and Jennie Tate the Australian Film Institute award for Best Achievement in Costume Design.

Death
He died in Sydney on 29 November 1987 after a long illness.

Works

Plays
 The Slaughter of St Teresa's Day (1959 - published 1972, Currency Press)
 Talk to the Moon (1963 - published 1977, Currency Press)
 Listen Closely (1972 - published 1977, Currency Press)
 Muriel's Virtues (1966)
 Animal Grab
 An Eager Hope
 The Fair Sister
 The Landladies
 A Hard God (1974, Currency Press)
 Mates (1977, Currency Press)
 Trespassers Will Be Prosecuted (1977, Currency Press)
 Furtive Love (1980, Currency Press)

Television writing
 The Slaughter of St Theresa's Day (1960) (adapted for TV)
 Dust or Polish (1972) (TV, adaptation of a novel by Norman Lindsay)
 The Emigrants (1976) (BBC TV)
 A Hard God (1981) (adapted for TV)

Film
 The Good Wife (1987)

Notes

References
 AustLit Agent - Kenna, Peter Joseph (Retrieved 9 March 2008)
 Plays by Peter Kenna (Retrieved 9 March 2008)
 Fifty Australians - Tilly Devine Australian War Memorial (Retrieved 9 March 2008)
 

1930 births
1987 deaths
Australian male dramatists and playwrights
Australian screenwriters
Australian television writers
20th-century Australian dramatists and playwrights
Australian male television writers
Burials at Rookwood Cemetery
20th-century Australian screenwriters